Dame Mavis McDonald, DCB (born 23 October 1944) is a British academic and civil servant. She served as Permanent Secretary, Office of the Deputy Prime Minister and was named Dame Commander of the Order of the Bath (DCB) in 2004.

Career
In 1966, after completing her BSc in Economics and Politics at the London School of Economics, she joined the Ministry of Housing and Local Government. From 1995-2000, she served as Director General at the DOE and then the Department for the Environment, Transport and the Regions (DETR). She was named Permanent Secretary of the Cabinet Office, responsible for the Modernising Government agenda (2000-2002). She retired from the Civil Service in 2005. Although she never attended Birkbeck College she was named as one of the College's independent Governors.

McDonald's affiliations can be found here.

As an Under Secretary in the Department of the Environment on 2nd September 1991 Mavis McDonald signed the Order to Dissolve Telford Development Corporation.

https://www.legislation.gov.uk/uksi/1991/1980/made

References

External links
 Engaging Communities 2005 website
 Interview with The Guardian

1944 births
Living people
Alumni of the London School of Economics
British civil servants
Dames Commander of the Order of the Bath
Permanent Secretaries of the Office of the Deputy Prime Minister
Place of birth missing (living people)
Civil servants in the Ministry of Housing and Local Government